Goodge may refer to:

People
 Barnaby Goodge (1540–1594), English poet and translator
 Robert Goodge, member of Australian mixing outfit Filthy Lucre
 W. T. Goodge (1862–1909), English-Australian writer and journalist

Other
 Goodge Col, a geographic feature in Antarctica

See also
 Goodge Street shelter, see London deep-level shelters
 Goodge Street tube station, London
 Goodge Street (LCR) tube station, London